The Swedish Sailing Federation is the national governing body for the sport of sailing in Sweden, recognised by the International Sailing Federation.

Notable sailors
See :Category:Swedish sailors

Olympic sailing
See :Category:Olympic sailors of Sweden

Offshore sailing
See :Category:Swedish sailors (sport)

Yacht Clubs
See :Category:Yacht clubs in Sweden

References

External links
 Official website
 ISAF MNA Microsite

Sweden
Sailing
Yachting associations
Sailing governing bodies
1895 establishments in Sweden
Sailing in Sweden
Sports organizations established in 1895